Cathedral of St. Francis de Sales or St. Francis de Sales Cathedral may refer to:

India
St. Francis de Sales Cathedral, Nagpur
St. Francis de Sales Cathedral (Aurangabad, Maharashtra)

United States
Cathedral of Saint Francis de Sales (Oakland, California)
Cathedral of St. Francis de Sales (Houma, Louisiana)
Saint Francis de Sales Cathedral (Baker City, Oregon)

See also 
 St. Francis de Sales' Church (disambiguation)
 Francis de Sales (disambiguation)